Joseph E. McGrath (July 17, 1927 – April 1, 2007) was an American social psychologist, known for his work on small groups, time, stress, and research methods.

Biography 
McGrath was born in DuBois, Pennsylvania, the last child of six. He served the U.S. Army from 1945 to 1946. He received a B.S. and an M.A. in Psychology at the University of Maryland in 1950 and 1951, respectively.

He married Marion Freitag in 1952. They had four children: Robert (born 1954), William (born 1955), James (born 1958), and Janet (born 1959). In 1955 McGrath completed a Ph.D. in Social Psychology at the University of Michigan with thesis adviser Theodore M. Newcomb. Upon graduation, McGrath became research scientist and project director of Psychological Research Associates in Arlington Virginia for two years, and then vice president of Human Sciences Research, Inc. in McLean Virginia for three years. Wishing to return to basic research and academia, in 1960 McGrath accepted a visiting position in the Department of Psychology at the University of Illinois as research assistant professor and associate director of the Group Effectiveness Laboratory. In 1962 he received a tenure track appointment there as assistant professor. He was tenured as an associate professor in 1964 and promoted to full professor in 1966. McGrath served as head of the Psychology Department for five years, from 1971 to 1976. He became a professor emeritus in 1997 and remained active in his research and collaborations until his death in 2007.

Teaching 
McGrath taught several courses popular among Ph.D. students at the University of Illinois. These included the introductory course, Research Methods in Social Psychology, taken by generations of graduate students; an introductory course to Research Topics in Social Psychology; a recurring seminar on Small Groups; a Professional Problems seminar in which students learned to write grant proposals, develop career strategies, review papers for journals, respond to reviews, and collaborate; a Post Positivism seminar exploring the underlying assumptions of "normal" science and alternative assumptions, values, and methods; and a seminar dedicated to Feminist Scholarship in Social Psychology.

McGrath was particularly successful as a mentor and adviser to graduate students. McGrath mentored dozens of students and young scholars throughout his career, including Richard Hackman, David Brinberg, Janice Kelly, David Harrison, Andrea Hollingshead, Deborah Gruenfeld, Holly Arrow, Linda Argote,  Kathleen O'Connor, Kelly Henry, Jennifer Berdahl, William Altermatt, and Franziska Tschan. McGrath was unusually generous with his time and collaborations with students, who enjoyed not only his extensive knowledge of the field and incisive intellect but the way in which he respected them as equals and encouraged their own interests and ideas.

Group dynamics
McGrath's work in group dynamics included the classification of group tasks into four basic goals.  They are generating, choosing, negotiating and executing.  McGrath further sub-divided these four creating 8 types of tasks.  Type 1 is generating plans (planning tasks); type 2 is generating ideas (creativity tasks); type 3 is solving problems with correct answers (intellective tasks); type 4 is deciding issues with no right answer (decision making tasks); type 5 is resolving conflicts of view point (cognitive conflict tasks); type 6 is resolving conflicts of interest (mixed motive tasks); type 7 is resolving conflicts of power (contests, battles and competitive tasks); and type 8 is executing performance tasks (performances, psycho-motor tasks). McGrath created a circumplex depicting these eight tasks in quadrants which indicated each type of task as either conflict or cooperation and as either conceptual or behavioral.  Creativity and Intellective tasks (types 2 and 3) were in the cooperation and conceptual quadrant.  Decision-making tasks and cognitive conflict tasks (types 4 and 5) were in the conflict and conceptual quadrant.  Mixed-motive tasks and contests/battles/competitive tasks (types 6 and 7) were in the conflict and behavioral quadrant. Performances/psycho-motor tasks and planning tasks (types 8 and 1) were in the cooperation and behavioral quadrant.

McGrath's circumplex of group tasks is referenced by Donelson R. Forsyth in his book Group Dynamics where he notes that while only one of McGrath's sub-groups of tasks may be utilized by some groups, there are groups that will perform tasks from multiple sub-groups of tasks.  Groups focused only on generating goals are working towards creating new methods or using existing methods to achieve their goals while groups focused on choosing goals are deciding on a correct course of action or what they deem the best course of action from among various options.  Groups focused on negotiating goals are working to resolve differences or competitive disputes and groups focused on executing are competing against other groups or performing.  There are groups that will have mixed goals from the various types.

Service to the profession 

President of the Society for the Psychological Study of Social Issues (SPSSI; Division 9 of the American Psychological Association), 1985–1986.
Executive Council (1979–1982) and Secretary-Treasurer (1980–83) of the [hSociety of Experimental Social Psychology (SESP).
Editor, Journal of Social Issues, 1977–1983.
Co-Editor for North America, Time and Society, 1991–1997.
Consulting Editor (Masthead): Journal of Applied Psychology (1970–1975) and Journal of Personality and Social Psychology, Interpersonal Relations and Group Processes Section (1980–2007).
Editorial Advisory Board: Journal of Social Issues (1983–1992); Applied Social Psychology Annual  (1986–1990); American Behavioral Scientist (1989–2007); Small Group Research (1992–2007); and Group Dynamics: Theory, Research and Practice.

Books
McGrath, J. E. (1964). Social Psychology: A Brief Introduction. New York: Holt, Rinehart & Winston.
McGrath, J. E., & Altman, I. (1966). Small Group Research: A Synthesis and Critique of the Field. New York: Holt, Rinehart & Winston.
Runkel, P. J. & McGrath, J. E. (1972). Research on Human Behavior: A Systematic Guide. New York: Holt, Rinehart & Winston.
McGrath, J. E. Martin, J., & Kulka, R. A. (1982). Judgment Calls in Research. Beverly Hills, CA: SAGE Publications Inc.
McGrath, J. E. (1984). Groups: Interaction and Performance. Inglewood, N. J.: Prentice Hall, Inc.
Brinberg, D. & McGrath, J. E. (1985). Validity and the Research Process. Beverly Hills, CA: SAGE Publishing Co.
McGrath, J. E. & Kelly, J. R. (1986). Time and Human Interaction: Toward a Social Psychology of Time. New York: Guilford Publications, Inc.
Kelly, J. R. & McGrath, J. E. (1988). On Time and Method. Newbury Park, CA: SAGE Publishing Co.
McGrath, J. E. & Hollingshead, A. B. (1994). Groups Interacting with Technology: Ideas, Issues, Evidence, and an Agenda. Newbury Park, CA: SAGE Publications.
Arrow, H., McGrath, J. E. & Berdahl, J. L. (2000). Small Groups as Complex, Systems: Formation, Coordination, Development, and Adaptation. Thousand Oaks, CA: SAGE Publishing Co.
McGrath, J. E. & Tschan, F. (2004). Temporal  Matters in Social Psychology: Examining the role of time in the lives of groups and individuals. Washington DC: APA Publications.

References

1927 births
2007 deaths
University of Maryland, College Park alumni
University of Michigan alumni
University of Illinois faculty
Social psychologists
20th-century American psychologists